Pakistan Red Crescent Society, is a humanitarian organization that provides emergency medical and relief services in Pakistan. The organization was founded on 20 December 1947 after Pakistan's independence by an order called The Pakistan Red Cross Order, issued by Muhammad Ali Jinnah, as Governor General of Pakistan. He became the founding president of the Society. It was later renamed the Red Crescent Society or the Red Crescent Order. Its national headquarters are in Islamabad.

Pakistan Red Crescent is the largest humanitarian organization in Pakistan and was formed by act of Parliament in 1947. It is working with a mission to become leading humanitarian organization of Pakistan, committed to prevent and alleviate human sufferings by mobilizing the power of humanity through volunteers.

Branches 
Pakistan Red Crescent Society's headquarters are located in Islamabad, while it has branches in all administrative units of Pakistan. These branches, as well as the 92 district level branches spread across the country, ensures that the coordination of the Society's field operations.

Volunteers 
Pakistan Red Crescent Society had about 253,000 volunteers in 2014. It is estimated to have 1.8 million volunteers across Pakistan.

Works
Pakistan Red Crescent is highly regarded in Pakistan by its respective stakeholders and the public and has over the years been well known for saving lives and strengthening recovery in disasters, contributing towards healthy living, and promoting social cohesion in vulnerable communities. It has emerged as the leading humanitarian organization in the country by providing immediate response in national disasters supported by its vast network of staff and volunteers. PRC has undergone significant developments through the support of its Movement Partners over the years, expanding the capacity of the organization to develop its core activities and respond to disasters.

In 2010, after one of the largest floods in Pakistani history, the Red Crescent Society provided much-needed support to native Pakistanis who were without food or water. They also joined forces with the American Red Cross in this effort, and were given $100,000 in aid to combat the devastation of the flood.

In 2014, the Pakistan Red Crescent Society in Sindh, in association with the JDC Welfare Organization, provided medical aid to some 300 mourners with doctors, paramedical staff, and volunteers during a two-day medical camp organized in connection with Youm-e-Ashoor at Numaish Chowrangi, Karachi.

See also
 International Red Cross and Red Crescent Movement
 List of Red Cross and Red Crescent Societies

References

External links
Pakistan Red Crescent Website 
Pakistan Red Crescent Profile 

Emergency medical services in Pakistan
Medical and health organisations based in Pakistan
Red Cross and Red Crescent national societies
Organisations based in Islamabad
Organizations established in 1947
1947 establishments in Pakistan